Anttila is a Finnish surname. Notable people with the surname include:
 Akseli Anttila (1897–1953), Finnish-born Soviet general
 Bill Anttila (1919–2011), American water polo coach
 Erin Anttila (born 1977), Finnish singer
 Kalle Anttila (1887–1975), Finnish wrestler
 Liisa Anttila (born 1974), Finnish orienteer
 Marko Anttila (born 1985), Finnish ice hockey player
 Miikka Anttila (born 1972), Finnish rally co-driver
 Sirkka-Liisa Anttila (born 1943), Finnish politician
 Ulla Anttila (born 1963), Finnish politician

See also
Hämeen-Anttila, a compound surname

Finnish-language surnames